Edições Novembro E.P. (English: November publishing house) is the state-owned newspaper publishing company of Angola. 

Edições Novembro publishes the one and only daily newspaper in Angola, Jornal de Angola and two weeklies, the Jornal dos Desportos (Sports) and Jornal de Economia. 

The seat of the company is the capital city Luanda. The general directory of Edições Novembro E.P. is José Ribeiro (Angola).

See also
Grupo Medianova privately owned media publisher

References

External links
Masthead of Jornal de Angola
Masthead of Jornal dos Desportes
Jornal de economia online edition

Companies based in Luanda
Mass media companies of Angola
Mass media in Angola